Alina Ilie (born 13 May 1996) is a Romanian handballer who plays for SCM Gloria Buzău.

Achievements 
IHF Youth World Championship:
Gold Medalist: 2014
IHF Junior World Championship:
Bronze Medalist: 2016

References
 

1996 births
Living people
Sportspeople from Râmnicu Vâlcea
Romanian female handball players